The 2020 Settimana Internazionale di Coppi e Bartali was a road cycling stage race that took place between 1 and 4 September 2020 in the Italian region of Emilia-Romagna. It was the 35th edition of the Settimana Internazionale di Coppi e Bartali and was part of the 2020 UCI Europe Tour as a category 2.1 event.

The race was originally scheduled to be held from 25 to 29 March, but the COVID-19 pandemic forced its cancellation. However, in May, with the new UCI post-lockdown racing calendar, the race was rescheduled for 1 to 4 September.

Teams 
Nine UCI WorldTeams, eleven UCI ProTeams, and eight UCI Continental teams made up the twenty-eight teams that participated in the race. Of these teams, with five riders, was the only one to not enter the maximum allowed of six riders. 117 of the 167 riders to start the race finished.

UCI WorldTeams

 
 
 
 
 
 
 
 
 

UCI ProTeams

 
 
 
 
 
 
 
 
 
 
 

UCI Continental Teams

Route

Stages

Stage 1a 
1 September 2020 — Gatteo to Gatteo,

Stage 1b 
1 September 2020 — Gatteo to Gatteo,  (TTT)

Stage 2 
2 September 2020 — Riccione to Sogliano al Rubicone,

Stage 3 
3 September 2020 — Riccione to Riccione,

Stage 4 
4 September 2020 — Forlì to Forlì,

Classification leadership table 

 On stage 1b, Ethan Hayter, who was second in the points classification, wore the red-and-white jersey, because first-placed Olav Kooij wore the white jersey as the leader of the general classification. For the same reason, Davide Persico, who was third in the young rider classification, wore the orange jersey, as Hayter was also second in the young rider classification.
 On stage 2, João Almeida, who was second in the young rider classification, wore the orange jersey, because first-placed Mikkel Frølich Honoré wore the white jersey as the leader of the general classification.
 On stage 3, Olav Kooij, who was second in the points classification, wore the red-and-white jersey, because first-placed Andrea Bagioli wore the white jersey as the leader of the general classification. For the same reason, Jhonatan Narváez, who was second in the young rider classification, wore the orange jersey.
 On stage 4, João Almeida, who was third in the young rider classification, wore the orange jersey, because first-placed Andrea Bagioli wore the white jersey as the leader of the general classification and second-placed Jhonatan Narváez wore the red-and-white jersey as the leader of the points classification.

Final classification standings

General classification

Points classification

Mountains classification

Young rider classification

Team classification

Notes

References

Sources

External links 
 

2020
Settimana Internazionale di Coppi e Bartali
Settimana Internazionale di Coppi e Bartali
Settimana Internazionale di Coppi e Bartali
Settimana Internazionale di Coppi e Bartali